The Purcaru is a left tributary of the river Doftana in Romania. It flows into the Doftana in the village Doftana.

References

Rivers of Romania
Rivers of Prahova County